The Salle Le Peletier or Lepeletier (sometimes referred to as the Salle de la rue Le Peletier or the Opéra Le Peletier) was the home of the Paris Opera from 1821 until the building was destroyed by fire in 1873. The theatre was designed and constructed by the architect François Debret on the site of the garden of the Hôtel de Choiseul on the rue Lepeletier. Due to the many changes in government and management during the theatre's existence, it had a number of different official names, the most important of which were: Théâtre de l'Académie Royale de Musique (1821–1848), Opéra-Théâtre de la Nation (1848–1850), Théâtre de l'Académie Nationale de Musique (1850–1852), Théâtre de l'Académie Impériale de Musique (1852–1854), Théâtre Impérial de l'Opéra (1854–1870), and Théâtre National de l'Opéra (1870–1873).

History

When King Louis XVIII's nephew, Charles Ferdinand, duc de Berry, was fatally stabbed on the night of 13 February 1820 in front of the former theatre of the Paris Opera, the Salle de la rue de Richelieu, the king decided that the theatre would be demolished in order to build a commemorative chapel in its place. However, the project to build a chapel was never carried out due to the 1830 revolution. Today the Fontaine Louvois in the Square Louvois occupies the spot where the chapel would have been built. The Salle de la rue de Richelieu had been the principal venue of the Paris Opera since 1794. Very soon after the death of his nephew in February 1820, the king commissioned the architect François Debret to design a new theatre for the Opéra on the Rue Le Peletier, which was completed one year later. During the construction the opera and ballet companies occupied the Théâtre Favart and the Salle Louvois.

The Salle Le Peletier was inaugurated on 16 August 1821 with a mixed-bill that opened with the anthem "Vive Henry VIII", and included the composer Catel's opera Les bayadères and the Ballet Master Gardel's ballet Le Retour de Zéphire. Although the theatre was meant to be temporary and was built of wood and plaster, it continued to be used by the Opéra for more than fifty years. Many of the great grand operas of the 19th century were presented for the first time on its stage, among them: Rossini's Guillaume Tell (1829), Meyerbeer's Robert le Diable (1831), Halévy's La Juive (1835), and Verdi's Don Carlos (1867).

The theatre, which was 14,000 square metres in area with a 104 ft. stage, was quite advanced for its time. On 6 February 1822 gas was used for the first time in order to light the stage effects in Nicolas Isouard's opera Aladin ou La Lampe merveilleuse. The stage and orchestra pit were able to be removed in order to transform the auditorium into a massive hall which could accommodate large balls and other festivities.

Ballet
Along with the Ballet of Her Majesty's Theatre in London, the Salle Le Peletier played host to the heyday of the romantic ballet, with such Balletmasters as Jules Perrot, Arthur Saint-Léon, Filippo Taglioni, Joseph Mazilier, Jean Coralli, and Paul Taglioni staging many masterworks for the Paris Opera Ballet. Among these works: La Sylphide (1832), Giselle (1841), Paquita (1846), Le corsaire (1856), Le papillon (1860), La source (1866), and Coppélia (1870). Among the great ballerinas to grace the stage of the Opéra during this time were Marie Taglioni, Carlotta Grisi, Carolina Rosati, Fanny Elssler, Lucile Grahn, and Fanny Cerrito.

Chess
In 1858 the Salle Le Peletier was the setting for one of the most famous games in the history of Chess, the Opera Game between the American master Paul Morphy (White) and two French aristocrats, the Duke of Brunswick and Count Isouard. The game was played in the Duke's private box during a performance of Bellini's Norma.

Fire
On the night of 29 October 1873, the Salle Le Peletier met the same fate as many of its predecessors: it was destroyed by a fire which raged for 27 hours, believed to have been started by the theatre's innovative gas lighting. Fortunately, in 1858 Emperor Napoleon III had hired the civic planner Baron Haussmann to begin construction on a second theatre at a more prominent location for the Parisian Opera and Ballet based on the design of architect Charles Garnier. In 1875, the new theatre, today known as the Palais Garnier, was inaugurated.

Gallery

Notable premières
Operas

Ballets
La fille mal gardée (1828) – choreography by Jean-Pierre Aumer; music by Ferdinand Hérold
La Sylphide (1832) – choreography by Filippo Taglioni; music by Jean Madeleine Schneitzhoeffer
La fille du Danube (1836) – choreography by Filippo Taglioni; music by Adolphe Adam
Le diable amoureux (1840) – choreography by Joseph Mazilier; music by Napoléon Henri Reber and François Benoist
Giselle (1841) – choreography by Jean Coralli and Jules Perrot; music by Adolphe Adam (additional music by Friedrich Burgmüller)
La Péri (1843) – choreography by Jean Coralli; music by Friedrich Burgmüller
Le diable à quatre (1845) – choreography by Joseph Mazilier; music by Adolphe Adam
Paquita (1846) – choreography by Joseph Mazilier; music by Edouard Deldevez
Le corsaire (1856) – choreography by Joseph Mazilier; music by Adolphe Adam
Le marché des innocents (1859) – choreography by Marius Petipa; music by Cesare Pugni
Le papillon (1860) – choreography by Marie Taglioni; music by Jacques Offenbach
La source (1866) – choreography by Arthur Saint-Léon; music by Léo Delibes and Léon Minkus
Coppélia (1870) – choreography by Arthur Saint-Léon, music by Léo Delibes

References
Notes

Sources
Barbier, Patrick (1995). Opera in Paris, 1800–1850: A Lively History. Portland, Oregon: Amadeus Press. .
Fauser, Annegret, editor; Everist, Mark, editor (2009). Music, theater, and cultural transfer. Paris, 1830–1914. Chicago: The University of Chicago Press. .
Loewenberg, Alfred (1978). Annals of Opera 1597–1940 (third edition, revised). Totowa, New Jersey: Rowman and Littlefield. .
Mead, Christopher Curtis (1991). Charles Garnier's Paris Opera. Cambridge, Massachusetts: The MIT Press. .
Pitou, Spire (1983). The Paris Opéra: an encyclopedia of operas, ballets, composers, and performers (3 volumes). Westport, Connecticut: Greenwood Press. .
Pitou, Spire (1990). The Paris Opéra: An Encyclopedia of Operas, Ballets, Composers, and Performers. Growth and Grandeur, 1815–1914. New York: Greenwood Press. .
Simeone, Nigel (2000). Paris: a musical gazetteer. Yale University Press. .

External links
Opéra National de Paris
Notes on the Académie Royale de Musique from the Scholarly Societies Project

Opera houses in Paris
Former theatres in Paris
Former music venues in France
Ballet venues
Music venues completed in 1821
Theatres completed in 1821
Buildings and structures demolished in 1873
Demolished buildings and structures in France
1821 establishments in France
1873 disestablishments in France